Bassarona is a genus of brush-footed butterflies found in India and Southeast Asia.

Selected species
 Bassarona byakko (Uehara & Yoshida, 1995)
 Bassarona dunya (Doubleday, [1848]) – great marquis
 Bassarona durga (Moore, [1858]) – blue duke
 Bassarona iva (Moore, [1858]) – grand duke
 Bassarona labotas (Hewitson, 1864)
 Bassarona piratica (Semper, 1888)
 Bassarona recta (de Nicéville, 1886) – red-tailed marquis 
 Bassarona teuta (Doubleday, [1848]) – banded marquis

 
Limenitidinae
Nymphalidae genera
Taxa named by Frederic Moore